Tyler Wotherspoon (born March 12, 1993) is a Canadian professional ice hockey defenceman for the Utica Comets of the American Hockey League (AHL) while under contract to the New Jersey Devils of the National Hockey League (NHL). He was selected by the Calgary Flames in the second round, 57th overall, at the 2011 NHL Entry Draft. Wotherspoon played four seasons of junior hockey for the Western Hockey League (WHL)'s Portland Winterhawks and was a member of the team's Western Hockey League championship team before turning professional in 2013.

Playing career

Junior
A native of Surrey, British Columbia, Wotherspoon was selected by the Portland Winter Hawks in the second round of the 2008 Western Hockey League (WHL) Bantam Draft. He made his WHL debut as a 15-year-old in 2008–09, appearing in four games for Portland, then played four full seasons between 2009 and 2013. In his WHL career, he has appeared in 239 games, scored 17 goals, and scored 65 assists. With the Winterhawks, he appeared in the WHL championship series in three consecutive years as Portland lost the final in 2011 and 2012 to the Kootenay Ice and Edmonton Oil Kings, respectively, before finally winning the Ed Chynoweth Cup championship in 2013 by defeating Edmonton. Wotherspoon was also named to the WHL's Western Conference second All-Star Team in 2012–13. Wotherspoon scored three points in five games at the 2013 Memorial Cup, however Portland lost the Canadian Hockey League (CHL) championship game, the Memorial Cup, to the Halifax Mooseheads, 6–4. During the season, Wotherspoon was also a member of the Canadian junior team, recording two points in six games at the 2013 World Junior Ice Hockey Championships.

Professional
The Calgary Flames had selected Wotherspoon with their second-round pick, 57th overall, at the 2011 National Hockey League (NHL) Entry Draft. Flames Special Assistant to the General Manager Craig Conroy described Wotherspoon as a player whose qualities often go unnoticed: "If you're a stay-at-home defenceman that can join the rush, make the good first pass, doesn't get beat one-on-one, very sound, it doesn’t stand out." Upon turning professional, Wotherspoon was assigned to Calgary's American Hockey League (AHL) affiliate, the Abbotsford Heat, for the 2013–14 season.  He had nine points in his first 48 games and a plus-minus of +13 when an injury to Dennis Wideman late in the season caused the Flames to recall Wotherspoon on an emergency basis. He made his NHL debut on March 7, 2014, a 4–3 victory over the New York Islanders. He recorded his first point the following night with an assist on a Brian McGrattan goal in a contest against the Vancouver Canucks. Wotherspoon appeared in 14 games with the Flames, recording four assists, before suffering a shoulder injury that required surgery and ended his season. Wotherspoon has been recalled and sent down by the Flames multiple times during the 2015-16 season.

On September 5, 2017, the Flames re-signed Wotherspoon to a one-year, two-way contract worth $650,000.

After five seasons within the Flames organization, Wotherspoon left as a free agent to sign a one-year, two-way contract with the St. Louis Blues on July 1, 2018.

On July 1, 2019, Wotherspoon was signed to a two-year, two-way contract with the Philadelphia Flyers.

On September 14, 2021, Wotherspoon was signed to a professional tryout contract (PTO) by the New Jersey Devils. After participating in training camp and pre-season, Wotherspoon was released from his tryout and signed to a one-year deal with AHL affiliate, the Utica Comets on October 13, 2021.

Following a successful season with the Comets, on the opening day of free agency, Wotherspoon was signed to a two-year, two-way contract by the New Jersey Devils to continue within the organization on July 13, 2022.

International play
In January 2022, Wotherspoon was selected to play for Team Canada at the 2022 Winter Olympics.

Personal life
Wotherspoon is the brother of Parker Wotherspoon, who was drafted 112th overall by the New York Islanders in the 2015 NHL Entry Draft.

Career statistics

Regular season and playoffs

International

Awards and honours

References

External links

 

1993 births
Living people
Abbotsford Heat players
Adirondack Flames players
Calgary Flames draft picks
Calgary Flames players
Canadian ice hockey defencemen
Ice hockey people from British Columbia
Lehigh Valley Phantoms players
Portland Winterhawks players
San Antonio Rampage players
Sportspeople from Surrey, British Columbia
Stockton Heat players
Utica Comets players
Ice hockey players at the 2022 Winter Olympics
Olympic ice hockey players of Canada